The Fleet Reserve Association (FRA) is a non-profit U.S. military and veterans organization headquartered in Alexandria, Virginia. chartered by the United States Congress that represents the interests of enlisted Navy, Coast Guard, and Marine veterans and active duty personnel in the United States.

FRA represents approximately; 277,428 active-duty members of the Navy,  163,346 active-duty of the Marine Corps  and 40,000 active-duty of the Coast Guard

The FRA was named after the US Navy retirement procedure "PERS 836". The organization was founded in Philadelphia on October, 1922, by Chief Yeoman George L. Carlin, and it was chartered on November 11, 1924, by the U.S. Congress. The association is composed of branches located in each State, U.S. territory, and several overseas locations.

The guiding principles of the FRA are Loyalty, Protection and Service. In addition to organizing events, members provide assistance at VA hospitals and clinics. It is active in issue-oriented U.S. politics. Its primary political activity is advocating on behalf of the Sea Service enlisted personnel, including support for benefits such as pay and pensions. The organization has also prompts "Americanism and Patriotism" through its essay contest.

History

1919: Chief Yeoman Robert W. White and Chief Gunner’s Mate Carl H. McDonald are the first enlisted personnel to testify before Congress. They present the enlisted perspective on military pay legislation.

1921: Chief Yeoman George Carlin conceives an association dedicated to monitoring all legislation that impacts enlisted personnel. Carlin is considered the father of the FRA.

1923: The Association’s Constitution and Bylaws Committee determined membership eligibility for the new organization. The document stated, “a shipmate is a shipmate, regardless of race, creed or color.”

Conceived as the U.S. Fleet Naval Reserve Association. The organization was chartered as Fleet Reserve Association under Title 36 of the United States Code.  Officially chartered by the U.S. Congress.

1925: FRA adopts its cardinal principles of “Loyalty, Protection and Service” as its official motto.

1925: The Association holds its first national convention in the place of its birth — Philadelphia.

Founded as an association for enlisted career Navy, FRA expanded its membership to Marine enlisted personnel in January 1956. The cover of the Naval Affairs published by The Fleet Reserve Association "For Career Navy and Marine Corps Enlisted Personnel. (Volume 35, No. 1 January 1958) By March 1957 the cover statesmen read  "The Magazine for Career Enlisted Men of the U.S. Navy and U.S. Marines Corps." (Naval Affairs, March 1957) The next significant change was in October 1970 when the cover statement was updates to The Magazine for Career Enlisted Personnel of the U.S Navy, Marine Corps and Coast Guard.  The elimination of the word "Men" was significant as it opened FRA membership to enlisted women of the sea services.

The June 1971 issue of Naval Affairs announced the New National Emblem which included the initials USN USMC and USCG.  The emblem was designed by Shipmate Willis H. Wolfe.

The Fleet Reserve Association Headquarters is located in Alexandria, Virginia. It is the primary office for the National President, and also is the Administrative Headquarters which houses the FRA museum, library, membership services, communications, and the magazine editorial offices.

Publications 
The organization's official monthly full color magazine was originally launched in 1921 and called U.S. Navy Magazine "Fleet Reserve Bulletin". In October 1931 it was renamed Naval Affairs.  In November 2006 the magazine's name and volume numbering system changed again, this time to FRAtoday. The publications typically is 48 pages of content.

See also

Armed Forces Day
Memorial Day
National Pearl Harbor Remembrance Day
Memorial Poppy
Veterans Day

References

External links
Fleet Reserve Association Homepage

United States military support organizations
Patriotic and national organizations chartered by the United States Congress
Organizations based in Alexandria, Virginia